Sky Sports is a group of Mexican subscription sports channels operated by the satellite pay television company Sky Mexico that was launched in 2015 as the replacement of the Planeta Fútbol program.

In December 2020, Sky announced the launch of the Sky Sports premium package with the intention of complementing the entertainment package offered by other pay TV systems that included all Sky exclusive sporting events and tournaments available as prepaid.

Channels 

 Sky Sports 1
 Sky Sports 2
 Sky Sports 3

Programming rights

Football 
 La Liga
 Segunda División
 Copa del Rey 
 FA Women's Super League
 Bundesliga
 2. Bundesliga
 DFL-Supercup
 UEFA Nations League (only Mexico)
 FIFA World Cup (only Mexico)
 Liga Iberdrola
 Frauen-Bundesliga
 Damallsvenskan

Basketball 
 FIBA Americas League

Baseball 
 Mexican Pacific League
 Caribbean Series

Hockey 
 National Hockey League

Tennis 
 Davis Cup

Programs broadcast by Sky Sports in Mexico 
 Real Madrid TV
 FIFA Fútbol Mundial
 La Liga World
 La Liga Show
 La Liga Preview
 La Liga Chronicles
 Sky Sports News
 Sky Premier Show
 FEI Classics
 PLTV-World
 Golfing world
 La Liga Méxicana Del Pacífico

Personalities 

  Alberto Manga
  Marc Puigpelat
  Lluis Carreras
  Jordi Pons
  Ivan Fanlo
  Alberto Perez
  Esteban Suárez
  Luis Milla
  Javier Marquez
  Sergio Vasquez
  Alberto Edjogo
  Marcos Gumiel
  Toni Pinilla
  Edu Pino
  Julia Headley
  Julio Hernández
  Juan Carlos Vera
  Miguel Robledo
  Ramón Cáceres
  Daniel Luis de Guevara
  Luis Enrique Pastor

References

External links
 

Latin American cable television networks
Television networks in Mexico
Sports television networks
Television channels and stations established in 2015
Spanish-language television stations
Companies based in Mexico City